Devin Carney (born May 10, 1984) is an American politician who has served in the Connecticut House of Representatives from the 23rd district since 2015.

He is the grandson of Academy Award winning actor Art Carney.

References

1984 births
Living people
Republican Party members of the Connecticut House of Representatives
21st-century American politicians